Kalyanji Virji Shah (30 June 1928 – 24 August 2000) was the Kalyanji of the Kalyanji-Anandji duo. He and his brother Anandji Virji Shah have been famous Indian film musicians, and won the 1975 Filmfare Award for Best Music Director, for Kora Kagaz.  He is a recipient of the civilian honour of Padma Shri (1992).India's fourth-highest civilian honour.

Birth and early life
Kalyanji was born to Virji Shah, a Kutchi businessman in Kundrodi, Kutch, Gujarat, who migrated from Kutch to Mumbai to start a Kirana (provision store). His younger brother and his wife are the husband and wife duo Babla & Kanchan.

He and his brothers began to learn music from a music teacher, who actually knew no music but taught them in lieu of paying his bills to their father. One of their four grand parents was a folk musician of some eminence. They spent most of their formative years in the hamlet of Girgaum (a district in Mumbai) amidst Marathi and Gujarati environs — some eminent musical talent resided in the vicinity.

Kalyanji's breakthrough was with the theme entitled Been music from the film Nagin (1954).

Filmography
Before joining Anandji Veerji Shah as Kalyanji–Anandji

Samrat Chandragupt (1958)

Post Box No.999 (1958)

Bedard Zamana Kya Jaane (1959)

Ghar Ghar Ki Baat (1959)

Oh Tera Kya Kehna (1959)

Delhi Junction (1960)

Family
Kalyanji's son, Viju Shah, is also a music director based in India.

References

External links

1928 births
2000 deaths
Filmfare Awards winners
People from Kutch district
Recipients of the Padma Shri in arts
Hindi film score composers
Gujarati people
20th-century Indian composers
Indian male film score composers
20th-century male musicians